Lesley Nicol (born 7 August 1953) is an English actress and a three-time SAG Award winner in the Best Cast in a Drama Series category for her role as Beryl Patmore in the ITV and PBS drama TV series Downton Abbey. She also starred in the 2019 feature film Downton Abbey. and its sequel.

Early life
Nicol was born and raised in Manchester, Lancashire. Her father was a doctor, and her mother was a model and television presenter.

She left school at the age of seventeen to attend Guildhall School of Music and Drama in London, from which she graduated.

Career
Nicol's television roles include Mrs Beaver in the BBC adaptation of The Lion, the Witch and the Wardrobe, the Queen Giant in The Silver Chair and as Henrietta Beecham in the 2019 ITV historical drama Beecham House. She made multiple appearances on ABC's The Catch in a recurring role playing the matriarch of a London gangland family and also guest-starred on episodes of Amazon Prime Video's The Boys, The CW's Supernatural (where she played a variation of the witch from Hansel and Gretel), CBS's reboot of The Odd Couple, ABC's Once Upon a Time and TVLand's Hot in Cleveland.

Theatre work
On stage, Nicol co-starred as "Rosie" in the original West End production of the international hit musical Mamma Mia! and originated the role of Kath in the Madness Musical Our House in the West End. She starred as Auntie Annie in East is East at London's Royal Court Theatre and later reprised her role in the BAFTA Best British Film Award-winning version of the play, also titled East Is East, as well as the film sequel, West is West.

Nicol wrote an original musical about her life and career with pop music songwriter Mark Mueller titled How the Hell Did I Get Here? The well-received show opened Off-Broadway in New York City in April 2022 and was nominated for an Off-Broadway Alliance Award after just 10 performances.  She and Mueller first performed it in 2017 at her alma mater, London's Guildhall School of Music and Drama, followed by a show in Hong Kong at that city's historic Fringe Club theater. In March 2022, the musical had its first, fully-staged performance in Chicago. The musical is directed by Luke Kernaghan and produced by Pemberley Productions. The show's North American tour in the summer of 2022 was postponed to a due to a "deep personal bereavement."

Personal life
Nicol married David Heald in 2007, whom she first met in 2003. He died in May 2022, aged 76.

Unlike her Downton Abbey character, Mrs Patmore, Nicol is a vegan and not a good cook.

Filmography

Awards

Screen Actors Guild Award

!Ref.
|-
| 2012
| Downton Abbey Cast
| Outstanding Performance by an Ensemble in a Drama Series
| 
|

|-
| 2013
| Downton Abbey Cast
| Outstanding Performance by an Ensemble in a Drama Series
| 
|

|-
| 2014
| Downton Abbey Cast
| Outstanding Performance by an Ensemble in a Drama Series
| 
|

|-
| 2015
| Downton Abbey Cast
| Outstanding Performance by an Ensemble in a Drama Series
| 
|

|-
| 2016
| Downton Abbey Cast
| Outstanding Performance by an Ensemble in a Drama Series
| 
|

References

External links

1953 births
Living people
English musical theatre actresses
English stage actresses
English television actresses
Actresses from Manchester
Actresses from Plymouth, Devon
Alumni of the Guildhall School of Music and Drama
English film actresses
20th-century English actresses
21st-century English actresses